Vincent J. Tasca (born May 21, 1997) is an American soccer player who plays as a goalkeeper.

Career

College & Amateur
Tasca played four years of college soccer at Wilmington University between 2015 and 2018.

During and after college, Tasca also appeared for NPSL side Philadelphia Lone Star in 2018 and 2019.

Professional
In September 2019, Tasca signed for NISA side Stumptown Athletic ahead of the league's inaugural season. 

On September 8, 2020, Tasca moved to USL Championship side Austin Bold.

References

External links
 Profile at Wilmington University Athletics
 Stumptown Athletic profile

1997 births
Living people
American soccer players
Association football goalkeepers
Wilmington Wildcats men's soccer players
Austin Bold FC players
Soccer players from Pennsylvania
National Premier Soccer League players
National Independent Soccer Association players
Sportspeople from Montgomery County, Pennsylvania
USL Championship players
Stumptown AC players